T channel may refer to:

 Mandelstam variables
 T-type calcium channel